The Oberliga Baden-Württemberg is the highest association football league in the state of Baden-Württemberg and the Baden-Württemberg football league system. It is one of fourteen Oberligas in German football, the fifth tier of the German football league system. Until the introduction of the 3. Liga in 2008 it was the fourth tier of the league system, and until the introduction of the Regionalligas in 1994 the third tier.

Overview
The league was formed in 1978 as the highest level of play in the state. Previous to that, the four Amateurligas Nordwürttemberg, Schwarzwald-Bodensee, Südbaden and Nordbaden formed the tier right below the 2nd Bundesliga. The Amateurligas changed their name since into Verbandsliga. The Amateurligas Nordwürttemberg and Schwarzwald-Bodensee merged to form the Verbandsliga Württemberg. The three Verbandsliga's now feed the Oberliga Baden-Württemberg.

Until 1994, the winners of the Oberligas had to play-off for the four promotion spots to the 2nd Bundesliga with the other Oberliga winners.

In 1994, the Regionalliga Süd was introduced, and the Oberliga Baden-Württemberg is automatically promoted to this league. In the inaugural season, five clubs from Baden-Württemberg were qualified for the new league, based on their performance over the last three seasons, these clubs being:

SSV Ulm 1846
SSV Reutlingen
VfR Mannheim
TSF Ditzingen
SpVgg Ludwigsburg

Originally, a sixth place for the Oberliga was available but because the Stuttgarter Kickers, a club from Württemberg, was relegated from the 2nd Bundesliga that year, the club took up this spot.

After the reduction of the number of Regionalligas from four to two in 2000, the Oberliga Baden-Württemberg still remained below the Regionalliga Süd, but this reduction meant that the Oberliga champions in that year were not promoted.

With the changes in the league system in 2008, there was four clubs from the Oberliga Baden-Württemberg promoted to Regionalliga Süd after the 2007-08 season, nominally the top four teams, however, there was also financial requirements to receive a Regionalliga license. The four clubs were:
 SC Freiburg II
 SSV Ulm 1846
 Waldhof Mannheim
 1. FC Heidenheim 1846

The winners of the three Verbandsligas gain automatic promotion to the Oberliga. The runners-up of North Baden then plays the runners-up of South Baden in a home-and-away series. The winner of this games faces the runners-up of Württemberg for the final Oberliga spot.

Feeder Leagues to the Oberliga Baden-Württemberg

Verbandsliga Württemberg
Verbandsliga Baden
Verbandsliga Südbaden

In the past two clubs which played in the Oberliga Baden-Württemberg weren't actually based in the state. TSV Amicitia Viernheim (Hesse) and SpVgg Au/Iller (Bavaria) both were in the Oberliga for a number of years.

The separation of Nordbaden and Südbaden is not traditional. It results from the end of World War II when North Baden was in the American occupation zone and South Baden in the French. Inter zone travel was difficult then and two separate leagues developed. Until 1950 the clubs from the South Baden and the Schwarzwald-Bodensee regions actually played in the southwest league system, the old (1945–1963) Oberliga Südwest, only after that were they integrated into the southern league system, where they geographically belonged.

For the 2012-13 season, the Regionalliga Süd was disbanded, and the Oberliga Baden-Württemberg became a feeder league to the new Regionalliga Südwest, together with the Hessenliga and the Oberliga Rheinland-Pfalz/Saar.

League champions
The league champions since 1979:

Source:
 In 2014 third placed FC Nöttingen was also promoted after a play-off.
 In 2016 runners-up Bahlinger SC were also promoted after a play-off.
 In 2016 runners-up FC Nöttingen were also promoted after a play-off.
 In 2021 competition was abandoned due to the COVID-19 pandemic.

Founding members of the league
The Oberliga started in 1978 with 20 clubs from four regions.

From the Amateurliga Nordwürttemberg:
SSV Ulm 1846
1. Göppinger SV
SpVgg Ludwigsburg
FC Eislingen
SB Heidenheim

From the Amateurliga Schwarzwald-Bodensee:
SSV Reutlingen
FV Biberach
FC Tailfingen
FV Ravensburg
VfB Friedrichshafen

From the Amateurliga Nordbaden:
FV Weinheim 09
SV Sandhausen
1. FC Pforzheim
VfR Mannheim
SV Neckargerach

From the Amateurliga Südbaden:
FC Rastatt 04
FC 08 Villingen
SV Kuppenheim
DJK Konstanz
Offenburger FV

League placings

Key

References

Sources
 Deutschlands Fußball in Zahlen,  An annual publication with tables and results from the Bundesliga to Verbandsliga/Landesliga. DSFS.
 Kicker Almanach,  The yearbook on German football from Bundesliga to Oberliga, since 1937. Kicker Sports Magazine.
 Süddeutschlands Fussballgeschichte in Tabellenform 1897-1988  History of Southern German football in tables, by Ludolf Hyll
 Die Deutsche Liga-Chronik 1945-2005  History of German football from 1945 to 2005 in tables. DSFS. 2006.

External links 
 Das deutsche Fussball Archiv  Historic German league tables
 Weltfussball.de  Round-by-round results and tables of the Oberliga Baden-Württemberg from 1994 onwards
 Online: Oberliga Baden-Württemberg 

 
Bad
Football competitions in Baden-Württemberg
1978 establishments in Germany